This is a list of Italian field armies that existed during World War I:
 1st Army 
 2nd Army 
 3rd Army 
 4th Army 
 5th Army 
 6th Army
 7th Army
 8th Army
 9th Army
 10th Army
 12th Army

See also 
 Military history of Italy during World War I

References

Italy in World War I
Italian
Military history of Italy during World War I
Military history of Italy
Field armies of Italy in World War I
Lists of military units and formations of Italy